Kristin Mellem (born 21 March 1965) is a Norwegian musician (violin), composer and conductor known for her involvement in Northern Norway's musical scene.

Mellem has contributed to the Eventyr festival in Tromsø since 1998, toured with Boknakaran (2001–2002), and contributed to releases with Moya på Tvoya.

With the Tromsø Symphony Orchestra she composed the performance  (Travels through time, 2002). In 2004, she composed  (Meeting of voices) with Solveig Kringlebotn and Ingor Ánte Áilo Gaup (joik) for Nordlysfestivalen; together with Gaup, Jeđđehus was released the following year and nominated for the 2005 Edvardprisen. In cooperation with  she composed and performed fiddle music with the Tromsø Symphony Orchestra for the production  –  (2004).

Mellem formerly led the band Vajas (English: 'Echo') with Nils Johansen (synthesizer) from Bel Canto and Ánde Somby (joik). Their debut was at Nana Urfolksdager in 2003, and they toured internationally as well as performing at by:Larm in 2004.

In 2008, she was awarded Trygve Hoff's memorial award.

References

External links 

 vajas.info
 mellems.com

1965 births
Living people
Norwegian classical composers
Norwegian classical violinists
Norwegian conductors (music)
Norwegian folk musicians
Women classical composers
Women conductors (music)
20th-century conductors (music)
20th-century classical composers
20th-century classical violinists
20th-century Norwegian musicians
21st-century conductors (music)
21st-century classical composers
21st-century classical violinists
Women classical violinists
21st-century Norwegian musicians
20th-century Norwegian women
21st-century Norwegian women
20th-century women composers
21st-century women composers